The Gaiety Theatre (1878-1882) of Boston, Massachusetts, was located on Washington Street on the block between West and Avery Streets. J. Wentworth oversaw its operations. It occupied the former Melodeon.  The Gaiety's 800-seat auditorium featured "walls and ceiling ... panelled in pink, with buff, gold and purple borders; the balcony fronts ... bronze, gray, and pink." In 1882 it became the Bijou Theatre.

References

1878 establishments in Massachusetts
1882 disestablishments in Massachusetts
Cultural history of Boston
Boston Theater District
Former theatres in Boston
Event venues established in 1878